The Yanks Are Coming is a 1963 American documentary film produced by Marshall Flaum. It was produced as a television movie for ABC. It was nominated for an Academy Award for Best Documentary Feature. Flaum wrote, produced, and directed the documentary, which is about American involvement in World War I.

See also
List of American films of 1963

References

External links

The Yanks Are Coming at the Wolper Organization

1963 films
1963 documentary films
American documentary films
American black-and-white films
Documentary films about World War I
United States in World War I
Western Front (World War I) films
Films directed by Marshall Flaum
1960s English-language films
1960s American films
American World War I films
World War I television films